H.M. Colonial Schooner Champion was in service with the Colony of Western Australia from 1836 until 1852.

George Fletcher Moore had travelled in Champion to the region and first located the bay in January of that year.

See also
Henry Bull (settler), captain of Champion in 1836

References

Schooners of Australia
1788–1850 ships of Australia